Jbel El Koudiate is an extinct shield volcano located 5 km west of the city of Ifrane in the Middle Atlas of Morocco. It is one of the three main volcanic structures of the Azrou region with Jbel Outgui and Jbel Tamarrakoit.

See also 

 Azrou volcanic field

References 

Atlas Mountains
Geography of Fès-Meknès
Extinct volcanoes
Mountains of Morocco
Volcanoes of Morocco